9th BSFC Awards
1989

Best Film: 
 Bull Durham 
The 9th Boston Society of Film Critics Awards honored the best filmmaking of 1988. The awards were given in 1989.

Winners
Best Film:
Bull Durham
Runner-up: Mississippi Burning
Best Actor:
Daniel Day-Lewis – The Unbearable Lightness of Being
Runner-up: Gene Hackman – Mississippi Burning 
Best Actress:
Melanie Griffith – Working Girl
Runner-up: Jodie Foster – The Accused 
Best Supporting Actor:
Dean Stockwell – Married to the Mob and Tucker: The Man and His Dream
Runner-up: Kevin Kline – A Fish Called Wanda 
Best Supporting Actress:
Joan Cusack – Married to the Mob, Stars and Bars and Working Girl
Runner-up: Frances McDormand – Mississippi Burning 
Best Director:
Stephen Frears – Dangerous Liaisons
Runner-up: Martin Scorsese – The Last Temptation of Christ 
Best Screenplay:
Ron Shelton – Bull Durham
Best Cinematography:
Sven Nykvist – The Unbearable Lightness of Being
Best Documentary:
The Thin Blue Line
Best Foreign-Language Film:
Salaam Bombay! • UK/India/France

External links
Past Winners

References 
1988 Boston Society of Film Critics Awards Internet Movie Database

1988
1988 film awards
1988 awards in the United States
1988 in Boston